Caroline Burnham Kilgore (January 20, 1838 – June 29, 1909) was the first woman admitted to the bar in the Commonwealth of Pennsylvania.

Kilgore was the first woman lawyer in Philadelphia. She was a school teacher and began to study law in 1875, when such narrow prejudice existed against woman receiving the benefit of a university course, that accompanying the refusal of her application for admission to the Law School of the University of Pennsylvania, was the courteous observation of the dean, that the time for him to resign would be when negroes and women were admitted. Kilgore persevered sixteen years before she became a recognized member of the bar.

Early years
Caroline Burnham was born in Craftsbury, Vermont, in 1838. Her father, James Burnham, was a woolen manufacturer while her mother Eliza Arnold Burnham was a former teacher. Kilgore was orphaned at age eleven.

Career
She supported herself as a domestic worker and later as a teacher. While working as a teacher, Kilgore continued her education at Craftsbury Academy and Newbury Seminary.

Kilgore taught in Wisconsin before switching her focus to medicine.  She enrolled in medical school at the Hygeia-Therapeutic College and completed her M.D. in 1865.

The University of Pennsylvania Law School rejected her application in 1871. She attempted to buy individual tickets to attend lectures. Sometime later, she sent her husband to purchase the lecture passes, but the Board of Trustees informed her that even if she attended every required lecture and passed all of the examinations, they would not guarantee that she would earn a diploma. After studying privately, Kilgore asked to take the bar exam in 1873 and 1874, but was refused.

After ten years of lobbying, Kilgore finally became the first female student admitted to the University of Pennsylvania Law School in 1881.  She graduated in 1883.

She was admitted to practice before the Supreme Court of Pennsylvania in 1885, and before the Supreme Court of the United States in 1890.

Kilgore was a member of the Citizens' Suffrage Association and tried to vote at city and county elections in 1871. She was ruled against and appealed to the full state supreme court, which affirmed the ruling against her. She published a pamphlet with her argument before the state supreme court, titled Woman Suffrage. The Argument of Carrie S. Burnham, which also included the opinion of the man who originally ruled against her, George Sharswood.

She died in Swarthmore, Pennsylvania, June 29, 1909, and was buried at Craftsbury Common Cemetery in Craftsbury, Vermont.

Legacy
During the University of Pennsylvania's Homecoming Weekend of October 1965, the Trustees dedicated Kilgore House, one of the four houses in the Robert C. Hill Residence Hall, in her honor.

She is listed as one of the Philadelphia Bar Association's Legends of the Bar.

See also
List of first women lawyers and judges in Pennsylvania

References

Attribution
 

1838 births
1909 deaths
American lawyers
American suffragists
American women physicians
University of Pennsylvania Law School alumni
People from Craftsbury, Vermont
19th-century American women lawyers
19th-century American lawyers